Linhai railway station is a railway station on the Ningbo–Taizhou–Wenzhou railway located in Linhai, Taizhou, Zhejiang, China.

This station is also served by the Hangzhou–Taizhou high-speed railway, opened on 8 January 2022.

References

Railway stations in Zhejiang